Orthomoia is a genus of moths of the family Noctuidae.

Species
 Orthomoia bloomfieldi Mustelin, 2000

Noctuidae